Gil Duldulao (born April 8, 1979) is an American dancer, choreographer and creative director. He has worked with artists such as Tina Turner, Jennifer Lopez, Nicki Minaj, Demi Lovato and is best known for his longtime collaborations with Janet Jackson.  Duldulao was Creative Director for Jackson's 2017 State of the World Tour.

References 

1979 births
Living people
American choreographers
American male dancers